Kukujevci–Erdevik railway station is a railway station on Belgrade–Šid railway. Located in Kukujevci, Šid, Serbia. Railroad continued to Šid in one and the other direction to Martinci. Kukujevci–Erdevik railway station consists of 5 railway track.

See also 
 Serbian Railways

References 

Šid
Railway stations in Vojvodina